Probable G-protein coupled receptor 45 is a protein that in humans is encoded by the GPR45 gene.

This intronless gene encodes a member of the G protein-coupled receptor (GPCR) family. Members of this protein family contain seven putative transmembrane domains and may mediate signaling processes to the interior of the cell via activation of heterotrimeric G proteins. This protein may function in the central nervous system.

References

Further reading

G protein-coupled receptors